The 2002 Campeonato Mineiro de Futebol do Módulo I was the 88th season of Minas Gerais's top-flight professional football league. The season began on February 3 and ended on May 30. Caldense won the title for the regular season, that being its first title, and Cruzeiro won the superchampionship, winning the title for the 31st time.

Participating teams

System 
The championship would have two stages.:

 First phase: Out of the twelve teams, the four that had qualified to the Copa Sul-Minas in the previous year received a bye to the Superchampionship and the remaining eight teams played a double round-robin tournament, in which the team with the most points would win the state title and qualify to the Superchampionship.
 Superchampionship: The champions of the first phase would join the four teams that had received a bye to the Superchampionship, and played a single round-robin tournament, in which the team with the most points would win the title.

League table

First phase

Superchampionship

References 

Campeonato Mineiro seasons
Mineiro